Elections were held in Minnesota on Tuesday, November 2, 2010. Primary elections took place on August 10, 2010.

Federal

United States House 

All eight seats in the United States House of Representatives are up for election in 2010.  All eight incumbents will be seeking re-election.

United States Senate 

Minnesota's two senators are not up for election in 2010.

State
Statewide offices in Minnesota, including Governor, Lieutenant Governor, Secretary of State, Attorney General, and Auditor are up for election in 2010.

Governor

Incumbent Gov. Tim Pawlenty, a Republican, is retiring from office after two terms. Candidates seeking to replace Pawlenty include State Rep. Tom Emmer, R-Delano; ; Former Sen. Mark Dayton, DFL-Minnesota; and activists Tom Horner for the Independence Party.

Secretary of State

Incumbent DFL Secretary of State Mark Ritchie is seeking re-election after an eventful first term in office, in which he oversaw the very tight election and subsequent recount in the 2008 U.S. Senate race between Al Franken and Norm Coleman.

Ritchie is being challenged by State Rep. Dan Severson, R-Sauk Rapids, who has been challenged for attempting to be listed on the ballot as Dan "Doc" Severson, in an apparent attempt to tie himself to former Tonight Show bandleader Doc Severinsen. Also running is Independence Party candidate Jual Carlson.

Attorney General

Incumbent DFL Attorney General Lori Swanson is seeking re-election after her first term in office. She is being challenged by Republican attorney and psychologist R. Christopher Barden and Independence Party candidate Bill Dahn.

State Auditor

Incumbent DFL State Auditor Rebecca Otto is seeking re-election after her first term in office. She is being challenged by former Republican State Auditor Patricia Anderson, who lost her position to Otto in 2006.

State Senate

All 67 seats in the Minnesota Senate are up for election in 2010. The DFL currently holds 46 seats in the body, compared with 21 for the Republicans. Republicans have not held control of the body since the end of the nonpartisan legislative era in 1973.

State House of Representatives

All 134 seats in the Minnesota House of Representatives are up for election in 2010. The DFL currently holds 87 seats in the body, compared to 47 for the GOP. Republicans most recently held the House from 1999 through 2007.

Local
Many elections for county offices will also be held on November 2, 2010.

References

External links
Elections & Voting at the Minnesota Secretary of State office
Official candidate list
2010 General election results
2010 Primary elections results
2010 Candidate filings
Candidates for Minnesota State Offices at Project Vote Smart
Minnesota at Ballotpedia
Minnesota Election Guide at Congress.org
Minnesota at OurCampaigns.com
Minnesota Polls at Pollster.com
Finance
2010 House and Senate Campaign Finance for Minnesota at the Federal Election Commission
Minnesota Congressional Races in 2010 campaign finance data from OpenSecrets
Minnesota 2010 campaign finance data from Follow the Money
Media'
Campaign 2010 at Minnesota Public Radio News

 
Minnesota